We Love Disney is a compilation series that features cover versions of Disney songs by contemporary artists. It is the successor to the Disneymania series of albums that were released from 2002 to 2010. The first album of the series was released in France in 2013. The second album was released in Australia in 2014 and included songs such as "Let It Go" (from Frozen) and "Baby Mine" (from Dumbo) and such artists as Dannii Minogue and The McClymonts. A 2015 release was released in the United States by Verve Records, with production by David Foster.

History
The first album in the series was released in France in 2013. The project was led by Mercury/Universal and included collaborations from artists that included Élodie Frégé and Ben l'Oncle Soul. It became the fourteenth best selling album in France in 2013. It charted in numerous countries, including #2 in Belgium, #2 in France, and #8 in Switzerland.

The second album in the series was released in Australia in November 2014, debuting at 69 on the Australia Album Chart. The album includes such Disney songs as "Let It Go" (from Frozen) and "Baby Mine" (from Dumbo) and such artists as Dannii Minogue and The McClymonts.

The third album was released in the United States in October 2015. It is produced by David Foster, current chairman of Verve Records. The album features musicians from various genres including country, pop, rock, and R&B.

In February 2016 a Latin American version with Spanish-speaking singers was announced. The first single released was a Spanish version of "Circle of Life" from The Lion King, performed by Mexican singer Alejandro Fernandez and featuring his daughter Camila.

Release history

 2013: 
We Love Disney, France
 2014:
 We Love Disney, Australia
 , France
 2015:
 We Love Disney, United States 
 , Indonesia
 , Italy
 We Love Disney Best-Of, France
 I Love Disney, Germany
 2016:
 We Love Disney, Latin America
 Everybody Loves Disney, United States
 We Love Disney 3, France
 Jazz Loves Disney, France
 2017:
 Jazz Loves Disney 2 – A Kind of Magic, France
 2019:
 We Love Disney, Sweden
 2021:
 Jazz Loves Disney (Deluxe), France

Chart history

We Love Disney (2013 album)

We Love Disney (2014 album)

We Love Disney (2015 album)

We Love Disney (2016 album)

References

Further reading
 Interview with David Foster

Walt Disney Records compilation albums
Verve Records compilation albums
2010s compilation albums
Covers albums
Mercury Records compilation albums
Universal Music Group compilation albums